The Uttam Nagar East Metro Station is located on the Blue Line of the Delhi Metro.

The station

Station layout

Entry/Exit

Connections

Bus
Delhi Transport Corporation bus routes number 724, 724C, 724EXT, 740EXT, 816, 816A, 816EXT, 817, 817A, 817B, 818, 819, 822, 824, 824LnkSTL, 824SSTL, 825, 826, 827, 828, 829, 832LinkSTL, 833, 834, 835, 836, 845, 872, 873, 876, 878, 883A, 891STL, serves the station from outside metro station stop.

Gallery

See also

Delhi
List of Delhi Metro stations
Transport in Delhi
Delhi Metro Rail Corporation
Delhi Suburban Railway
Delhi Monorail
Delhi Transport Corporation
West Delhi
New Delhi
Dwarka, Delhi
National Capital Region (India)
List of rapid transit systems
List of metro systems

References

External links

 
 Delhi Metro Annual Reports
 
 UrbanRail.Net – Descriptions of all metro systems in the world, each with a schematic map showing all stations.

Delhi Metro stations
Railway stations in West Delhi district